"Lilac Wine" is a song written by James Shelton (lyrics and music) in 1950. It was introduced by Hope Foye in the short-lived theater musical revue, Dance Me a Song. The song has since been recorded by many artists.

Lyrics
The lyrics form a narrative of heartache at losing a lover and taking solace from wine made from a lilac tree. The song focuses on the blissful oblivion achieved by becoming intoxicated. Its inspiration was a line in the 1925 novel Sorrow in Sunlight by Ronald Firbank, in which the main character, Miami Mouth, circulates through a party "offering a light, lilac wine, sweet and heady".

Cover versions 
"Lilac Wine" has been recorded by a number of artists including Eartha Kitt on her 1953 album That Bad Eartha, Helen Merrill in her album Helen Merrill with Strings (1955), Judy Henske on her debut, self-titled album (1963), Nina Simone on her album Wild Is the Wind (1966), Elkie Brooks (1978) and Jeff Buckley on his album Grace (1994). The Jeff Buckley version was used as background music in the 2006 French film Tell No One. It also appears on Katie Melua's debut studio album Call Off the Search (2003). Barb Jungr recorded a version for her 2008 tribute album to Nina Simone, Just Like a Woman. Jeff Beck played a solo in the version included on Emotion & Commotion (2010) with vocals by Imelda May. Miley Cyrus released it as a video in 2012, as part of her YouTube series, Backyard Sessions, The song was recorded by David Gahan and Soulsavers for their 2021 album Imposter.

The only artist to have major chart success with the song was Elkie Brooks, and the song remains closely associated with her, especially in the UK and Europe. Her rendition peaked at No. 16 in the UK Singles Chart in 1978. It was included on her 1981 album, Pearls.

Charts

Notes

Nina Simone songs
Jeff Buckley songs
Elkie Brooks songs
Songs about alcohol
1950 songs
1978 singles
A&M Records singles